is a Japanese rugby player. He plays at lock for the Japan national rugby union team. He is nicknamed the "Iron Man".

Ono started playing rugby after converting from baseball at Nihon University where he was studying to become a firefighter. However, he changed careers and joined Toshiba Brave Lupus in 2001, with whom he has gone on to win the Top League four times.

He became a regular member of the national team from there onwards and represented his country at both the 2007 and 2011 Rugby World Cup. Since Eddie Jones took over as Japan coach in 2012, he has not missed an international match, and has become the most capped player for Japan of all time.

Ono is one of the 'Frontier Ambassadors' of his hometown Koriyama City.

He retired from professional rugby in 2020

See also
Kosei Ono

References

External links

1978 births
Living people
Japanese rugby union players
Toshiba Brave Lupus Tokyo players
Rugby union locks
Japan international rugby union players
Nihon University alumni
People from Kōriyama
Sunwolves players